Written in the Stars may refer to:

 "Written in the Stars" (Elton John and LeAnn Rimes song), 1999
 "Written in the Stars" (Tinie Tempah song), 2010
 "Written in the Stars", a song by Blackmore’s Night from  Fires at Midnight
 "Written in the Stars", the third episode of the fifth season of Gilmore Girls
 "Written in the Stars", a song by Westlife from Unbreakable: The Greatest Hits Volume 1
 "Written in the Stars", the first original song by The Girl and the Dreamcatcher
 Written in the Stars (film), a 1925 German film